Yalchin Rzazadeh (31 December 1946 – 22 February 2021) was a Soviet period Azerbaijani pop singer. He became famous for his clear voice and perfect articulation.

Career
In 1963 he studied acting at the film school in Baku in Azerbaijan. After completing his studies, he went to the Conservatory where he studied voice. He was invited to work as a soloist for the state radio and television. In the early 1970s he took part in the master classes at La Scala in Milan to upgrade his vocal skills. Some of the best composers of that time, including Jahangir Jahangirov, Tofig Guliyev, and Emin Sabitoghlu, wrote music especially for him.

From the Soviet period until 1989, he was most famous for his vocals sung in films made in Azerbaijan.

He was living in Baku, Azerbaijan, and teaching vocal classes at the local conservatory.

Yalchin Rzazadeh died in 2021.

See also
 Giti Pashaei
 Parisa

References

External links
 Yalchin Rzazadeh Music

1946 births
2021 deaths
Azerbaijani pop singers